Big Gucci Sosa is a collaborative mixtape by Chicago-based rapper Chief Keef and Atlanta-based rapper Gucci Mane. The mixtape was released on October 31, 2014, by 1017 Records and Glo Gang. It features production from Mike WiLL Made-It, Drumma Boy, Metro Boomin, Honorable C.N.O.T.E., DJ Spinz, Dun Deal, and members of the 808 Mafia.

Track listing

Critical reception
Big Gucci Sosa received mixed reviews from critics. David Drake of Pitchfork described the mixtape as "parachuting Keef verses into the one-dimensional pulp-gangster formula that’s been Gucci Mane’s collaborative stock in trade since 2011," but praised the mixtape's production and Chief Keef's rapping. Matt Moretti of Buffablog described Gucci Mane as "the trap legend," but called Chief Keef's rapping "less than perfect," rating the album a B.

References

Chief Keef albums
Gucci Mane albums
2014 mixtape albums